Turki bin Salman Al Saud ( Turkī ibn Salmān Āl Su‘ūd) (born 1987) is a Saudi prince and businessman who is the chairman of Tharawat Holding Company. On 9 February 2013 he was appointed chairman of the Saudi Research and Marketing Group (SRMG) and served in the post until 6 April 2014.

Early life and education
Prince Turki was born in Riyadh in 1987. His mother is Fahda bint Falah Al Hithlain, the third spouse of King Salman. He is the ninth child of King Salman bin Abdulaziz. Prince Turki is the second eldest child of King Salman and Fahda bint Falah. He is the full brother of Mohammed bin Salman, defense minister and crown prince of Saudi Arabia, and of Prince Khalid, deputy defense minister. Prince Turki received a bachelor's degree in marketing from King Saud University.

Career and activities
Prince Turki was appointed chairman of the Saudi Research and Marketing Group (SRMG) in February 2013. He replaced his half-brother Prince Faisal in the post. Prince Turki's term as chairman ended in April 2014 when he resigned from the post.

Prince Turki is the chairman of Tharawat Holding Company. He has been dealing with his family’s private fortunes and foreign investments since 2015.

Ancestry

References

External links

Turki
1987 births
Turki
Turki
Living people
Turki
Turki
Turki